Sanand railway station is a railway station in Ahmedabad district, Gujarat, India on the Western line of the Western railway network. Two Passenger, two Express, and one Superfast trains halt here. Sanand is known for Sanand Plant (Tata Motors).

Nearby stations

Vasan Iyawa is the nearest railway station towards , whereas Goraghuma is the nearest railway station towards .

Trains

The following Express and Superfast trains halt at Sanand railway station in both directions:

 19217/18 Bandra Terminus–Jamnagar Saurashtra Janta Express
 19015/16 Saurashtra Express
 22945/46 Saurashtra Mail

References 

Railway stations in Ahmedabad
Ahmedabad railway division